Ayhan Aydan (1924, Ankara – 19 February 2009, Çeşme, Izmir) was a Turkish opera singer.

In 1944, she graduated from Ankara State Conservatory Opera Department. She appeared in some small operas. Carl Ebert noticed her, and her role as Susanna in the opera The Marriage of Figaro started her professional career. When she was 19 years old, she married musician Hasan Ferit Alnar and had a son named Aydan from this marriage. Ebert wanted to take Ayhan Aydan to England to participate on stage at the Glyndebourne Opera Festival, but she could not participate on this for some reason.

In 1951, his uncle Mithat Dulge met with Adnan Menderes, a lawyer he gave near Çubuklu Dam.

Aydan and Menderes were involved in a scandal that led to charges of adultery and baby-killing. Menderes was the first democratically elected prime minister of Turkey. In 1960, the May 27 coup d'état toppled the government, and Menderes and others were imprisoned on the island Yassıada and put on trial in a courthouse there.

In the "Baby Case", Menderes was accused of adultery with Aydan and killing the baby she gave birth to. She confessed her love by saying, "I love this man and he told me that my baby died during childbirth".

The "Baby Case" is the only case that resulted in acquittal in 13 cases. In the case of discretionary funds, it was understood that Adnan Menderes paid Ayhan Aydan's ex-wife at certain intervals. Menderes, the tenth Turkish Prime Minister, was executed by hanging by the coup soldiers.

Aydan's son died in London at the age of 18, poisoned by air. She did not comment on newspapers and magazines until the end of her life. She died on 19 February 2009 at noon in Çeşme district of Izmir.

References

1924 births
2009 deaths
Musicians from İzmir
Turkish Muslims
Hacettepe University alumni
State Artists of Turkey
Adnan Menderes
20th-century Turkish women opera singers